The Skeneopsidae are a family of very small sea snails, marine gastropod molluscs in the clade Littorinimorpha.

According to the taxonomy of the Gastropoda by Bouchet & Rocroi (2005), the family Skeneopsidae has no subfamilies.

Genera 
 Genus Skeneopsis T. Iredale, 1915
 Skeneopsis planorbis Fabricius, 1780 - flat skenea
 Skeneopsis sultanarum Gofas, 1983
 Genus Starkeyna

References 

 The Taxonomicon